Khmer is a Unicode block containing characters for writing the Khmer (Cambodian) language. For details of the characters, see Khmer alphabet – Unicode.

Block

History
The following Unicode-related documents record the purpose and process of defining specific characters in the Khmer block:

References 

Unicode blocks
Khmer language